Behe or Béhé is a surname. Notable people with the surname include:

Jonathan Béhé (born 1989), French football player 
Michael Behe (born 1952), American biochemist and author